Vicki Michelle,  (born 14 December 1950) is an English actress, radio presenter, businesswoman, film producer and former model. She is best known for her role as Yvette Carte-Blanche in the BBC television comedy series 'Allo 'Allo! and as recurring character Patricia Foster in the ITV soap opera Emmerdale. In 2014, she appeared on the fourteenth series of I'm a Celebrity...Get Me Out of Here.

Early life
The eldest of four daughters, Michelle was born in Chigwell, Essex. Her father Joseph was a fish trader at Billingsgate Fish Market and her mother Shirley an actress. One of her sisters is the actress and writer Ann Michelle. While her parents were at work, they employed an au-pair girl to look after Michelle and her three sisters; the girl they employed was future Hollywood actress Elke Sommer. Michelle attended Knewnham Junior School in Wanstead and then West Hatch High School. After O-levels she stayed on at school to complete a secretarial course. Hoping to become a ballet dancer she joined the Aida Foster stage school.

Acting career

Michelle was given small television roles while still at stage school, the first being in Dixon of Dock Green. She followed this with an uncredited appearance dancing at a party in The Haunted House of Horror (1969), and a role in the play Play It Again, Sam with Dudley Moore in the West End from 1969 to 1970. Michelle then had three separate female-lead roles in three different episodes of Softly, Softly: Task Force and appeared as Terry Collier's girlfriend in Whatever Happened to the Likely Lads? in 1974. She also had a starring role alongside her sister Ann in the horror film Virgin Witch (1972) before appearing with Joan Collins in Alfie Darling (1975), the sequel to Alfie (1966). Michelle then appeared in big-screen versions of popular English sitcoms The Likely Lads (1976) as a hitch-hiker with Penny Irving and George and Mildred (1980) as a girl in bed with the vicar. She also appeared regularly in the 1970s children's BBC TV series Crackerjack. Throughout the 1970s and 1980s, Michelle worked as a glamour model and a pin-up model.

Following a small role in Space: 1999, Michelle starred in the films Queen Kong (1976), The Sentinel (1977) and Spectre with John Hurt before appearing in an episode of The Goodies as a nurse. In 1976, she had a role in the popular The Two Ronnies sketch "The Phantom Raspberry Blower of Old London Town". In 1978, Michelle starred in the film The Greek Tycoon opposite Anthony Quinn; Michelle's role was initially larger than that in the finished film as Quinn personally asked the producers to reduce the size of Michelle's part thinking that her good looks and bright costume would detract the audience's attention from him. After this, Michelle had a small role as a French robot maid in the sitcom Come Back Mrs. Noah which was written by David Croft and played Bodie's girlfriend in an episode of the hard-hitting police drama The Professionals. Following a part in Minder, Michelle had a regular role as Sandra, Les Dawson's secretary, in the comedy sketch show The Dawson Watch from 1979 to 1980. In 1980, she had a recurring role in another famous The Two Ronnies sketch in which she played a state policewoman under the rule of a dystopian female leader played by Diana Dors.

Although the late sixties and seventies gave her success, Michelle gained significant attention, particularly in Ireland, after appearing as Sally O'Brien in a string of high-profile adverts for Harp Lager in the early 1980s. The slogan "Sally O'Brien and the way she might look at you" became synonymous with the company and brought Michelle to viewers' attention. There was a small outcry when it was revealed that the actress that played Sally O'Brien was in fact English, not Irish. Following on from this success, Michelle played the part of Millie in Priest of Love (1981) alongside Ava Gardner, John Gielgud and Ian McKellen before appearing in a second episode of The Professionals, in which she played Tina, the girlfriend of an organised crime boss played by John Junkin in the episode The Untouchables.

However, Michelle's big break was when she was offered the part of Yvette Carte-Blanche in the popular BBC sitcom 'Allo 'Allo!, produced and written by David Croft. Croft had remembered Michelle playing the French maid robot in an episode of his previous sitcom Come Back Mrs. Noah and offered her the role. Michelle played Yvette in all eighty-five episodes of the series from 1982 to 1992 as well as reprising the role in numerous stage plays based on the series. Although she was achieving high success, Michelle maintained a successful acting career alongside Allo, 'Allo!, and had roles in The Last Days of Pompeii, Cannon and Ball, The Little and Large Show and two episodes of the successful department store sitcom Are You Being Served? which was also written by David Croft. Michelle also appeared as Betty, a Cockney barmaid, in three episodes of The Kenny Everett Television Show. In 1985, Michelle toured in a production of Doctor in the House with Robin Askwith, Frazer Hines and Windsor Davies.   

Throughout the 1970s, 1980s and 1990s, Michelle appeared alongside some of the UK's most famous and favourite comedians such as Ronnie Barker and Ronnie Corbett, Les Dawson, Dick Emery, Kenny Everett, Cannon and Ball, Little and Large, Ken Dodd, Bobby Davro and Lenny Henry.

After Allo, 'Allo! ended in 1992, Michelle went straight into another main role in Noel's House Party as Noel Edmonds's man-eating neighbour. She would play this role until 1997, wherein she had a guest role in two episodes of Gayle's World playing a fictional version of herself as a leader of a group of leather-clad women bearing whips named the Killer Bimbos. In 1996, Michele played Lucy Westenra in a production of Dracula alongside Leslie Grantham in the title role. After having a part in the comedy film The Colour of Funny in 1999, Michelle auditioned for the role of Deedee Dove, the wife of Ray Winstone in the film Sexy Beast (2000). Although unsuccessful, as the role went to Amanda Redman, Winstone would remember Michelle.
In 2001, Michelle played Miss Hannigan in a touring production of Annie; she would reprise the role in various tours of the production in 2005 and 2007.

Remembering her from when she auditioned for Sexy Beasts, Ray Winstone cast Michelle as his wife in the somewhat controversial television film All in the Game in 2006. Also starring in the film were Idris Elba and Danny Dyer who played the part of Michelle and Winstone's son. In 2007 Michelle reprised the role of Yvette Carte-Blanche in The Return of 'Allo 'Allo! celebrating twenty five years since the show was first broadcast. From 2007 to 2009, Michelle played the recurring character Patricia Foster in the ITV soap opera Emmerdale.  Later in 2007, she appeared in a Children in Need special of Hotel Babylon and, the following year, appeared on the BBC cookery programme Celebrity MasterChef. From 2008 to 2009, Michelle went on tour with the 'Allo 'Allo! stage show. She played the role of Amanda Newman in the 2010 TV film Resentment.

In 2013, she played Deborah Whitton in the 2013 romantic comedy film The Callback Queen. In 2014, Michelle returned to the stage in the hit play Hello Norma Jeane at London's King's Head Theatre, where she took on the role of an Essex grandma who claims to be Marilyn Monroe.

In 2020 Vicki made her first appearance in the comedy award nominated sitcom radio and podcast series Barmy Dale. Michelle plays the continuing role of Angie Edwards, the wife of notorious killer, Branston, famed for pickling his victims. Http://Www.Barmyproductions.com

In February 2023, it was announced that Michelle would be joining the BBC One soap opera EastEnders in spring 2023 for a short guest stint.  It was later announced that Michelle would be playing Jo Cotton, the secret wife of Tom "Rocky" Cotton (Brian Conley).

Other ventures

Philanthropy and charity work
Michelle is actively involved in many charities and good causes. She was the longest-serving president of The Heritage Foundation and is the current president of  the eastern region of the Lady Taveners. As well as being a member of the Grand Order Of Lady Ratlings, Michelle is also an ambassador for Keep Britain Tidy, the SSAFA, Wetnose Animal Aid, Homeless Worldwide and a patron of the Gordon Craig Theatre, Macmillan Cancer Support, Barnardo's, Age UK, Marie Curie Cancer Care, Sign2Sing, the Blackfish Academy, the Talent Time Stage School, the Haven House Children's Hospice, the Essex Women's Advisory Group, The Dream Factory and AA Dog Rescue. She is also an Executive Committee Member of the Royal Variety Charity. She has also presented the Soldering On Awards since 2016.

Michelle is also a regular campaigner for Ban Trophy Hunting, Acting For Others, the Mane Chance Horse Sanctuary, Autism's Got Talent and also supports the armed forces charities Blind Veterans UK, the RAF Benevolent Fund, Pathfinders and Nowzad Dogs.

Business ventures
In 1992, Michelle and two of her sisters set up a company called Trading Faces, of which Michelle is the company director, which provides celebrity after-dinner speakers for corporate events. Amongst her list of clients are Charles Dance, Joan Collins, Joanna Lumley and Lord Sebastian Coe. The company's website also state that they also provide "film & video production facilities, multi-camera event coverage, CV & biography writing services, promotional & training films, film & TV commercials, press coverage, scriptwriting and product endorsement".

Radio
Michelle has been broadcasting a weekly chat show on Brentwood radio station Phoenix FM since October 2017, with celebrity guests including Rick Wakeman, Harry Redknapp, John Challis, Ray Cooney, Linda Lusardi and Robin Askwith.

Producing
In 2012, Michelle was executive producer of the film based on the Ray Cooney theatrical production Run for Your Wife.

Personal life
Michelle is married to Graham Fowler, a cinematographer, whom she married in 1974. She and Fowler have one daughter, Louise, born in 1989 who is also an actress, known as Louise Michelle. 

In September 2015, Michelle was a guest on Big Brother's Bit on the Side and feared she could have been blinded after being hit on the back of the head with a champagne glass thrown by Farrah Abraham during a fight between Abraham and Aisleyne Horgan-Wallace. The show had to be taken off air early and the incident prompted a police investigation. Michelle was hospitalised and suffered from whiplash, concussion and balance issues. She later pressed charges.

In 2016, Michelle said she suffers from tinnitus.

Honours
Michelle was appointed Member of the Order of the British Empire (MBE) in the 2010 Birthday Honours for her services to charity. She was also made a Dame of the Sovereign Hospitaller Order of St John of Jerusalem Knights of Malta in 2012.

Filmography

Film

Television

Reality television

Theatre
 1969 – Play It Again Sam – Go-Go Girl – West End – Joseph Hardy
 1985 – Doctor in The House – Vera – National Tour – Paul Elliott
 1986/87 – 'Allo 'Allo – Yvette Carte-Blanche – West End – Peter Farago
 1987/88 – 'Allo 'Allo – Yvette Carte-Blanche – International Tour – Peter Farago
 1993/94 – Don't Dress for Dinner – Jacqueline – National Tour – Peter Farago
 1995 – Don't Dress for Dinner – Jacqueline – National Tour – Peter Farago
 1996 – Dracula – Mina – National Tour – Alan Cohen
 1996/97 – 'Allo 'Allo – Yvette Carte-Blanche – National Tour – Peter Farago
 1998 – Don't Dress for Dinner – Jacqueline – National Tour – Ian Dickens
 1998 – Women of a Certain Age – Renee – National Tour – David Simmons
 1999 – Beauty and the Beast – Bathsheba – Landmark Theatre, Ilfracombe – Steve Shappelle
 2000 – Round and Round the Garden – Ruth – National Tour – Ian Dickens
 2001 – Table Manners – Ruth – National Tour – Ian Dickens
 2001 – Business Affairs – Hilda Bigley – National Tour – John B. Hobbs
 2001 – Annie – Miss Hannigan – Theatre Royal, Lincoln – Chris Colby
 2002 – The Tart and the Vicar's Wife – Glenda Parry – Theatre Royal, Lincoln – Chris Colby
 2002/03 – Don't Dress for Dinner – Jacqueline – International Tour – Ian Dickens
 2004 – Out of Order – Pamela Willey – National Tour – Ian Dickens
 2004 – Reflections – Narrator – Hazlitt Theatre, Maidstone
 2005 – Don't Dress for Dinner – Jacqueline – Overseas Tour – Chris Moreno
 2005 – Bedside Manners – Sally – Overseas Tour – Chris Moreno
 2005 – Annie – Miss Hannigan – Marlowe Theatre, Canterbury – Eric Potts
 2005 – Salads Days – Lady Raeburn & Asphynxia – National Tour – Matthew Townshend
 2005 – Stepping Out – Maxine – Theatre Royal, Lincoln – Chris Colby
 2006 – Funny Money – Betty – UK Tour – Giles Watling & Ian Dickens
 2006 – Salad Days – Lady Raeburn & Asphynxia – National Tour – Matthew Townshend
 2006 – Audacity – Gillian – Lyceum Theatre, Crewe – Jay Marcus
 2007 – Double Vision – Dawn & Donna – Lyceum Theatre, Crewe – Jay Marcus
 2007 – Annie – Miss Hannigan – Gordon Craig Theatre, Stevenage – Scott St. Martin
 2008 – Lock Up Your Daughters – Mrs. Squeezum – Hoxne – Matthew Townshend
 2008/09 – 'Allo 'Allo – Yvette Carte-Blanche – National Tour – James Robert Carson
 2009 – The Best Little Whorehouse in Texas – Mona Stangley – New Theatre, Hull – Jonathan Parker
 2010 – Wife Begins at Forty – Linda Harper – Grand Theatre, Blackpool – Brian Godfrey
 2010 – Stop Dreamin' – Vi Collins – UK Tour – Ray Cooney
 2011 – Stop Dreamin' – Vi Collins – UK Tour – Ray Cooney
 2012 – That's Love – Sarah Daniels – UK Tour – Ron Aldridge
 2012 – Wife Begins at Forty – Linda Harper – Yvonne Arnaud Theatre, Guildford – Ray Cooney
 2014 – The Importance of Being Earnest – Lady Bracknell – McGrigor Hall, Frinton – Edward Max
 2014 – Hello Norma Jeane – Lynnie – Kings Head Theatre, London – Matthew Gould
 2019 – Hormonal Housewives – Vicki – UK Tour – Julie Combe
 2021 – Hello Norma Jeane – Lynnie  – Southwold Arts Centre, Southwold – Dylan Costello
 2021 – Dirty Dusting – Olive – UK Tour – Ed Waugh
 2022 – Dirty Dusting – Olive – UK Tour – Ed Waugh
 2022 – The Wizard of Oz – Glinda the Good – UK Tour – Paul Boyd

Pantomime
 1983 – Snow White – Wicked Red Queen – Opera House, Cork
 1988 – Snow White – Wicked Queen – The Alexandra House, Birmingham
 1991 – Aladdin – Genie – The New Theatre, Cardiff
 1992 – Aladdin – Genie – Lyceum Theatre, Sheffield
 1993 – Jack and the Beanstalk – Fairy – The Grand Theatre, Swansea
 1994 – Aladdin – Genie – Theatre Royal, Plymouth
 1996 – Mother Goose – Fairy – Hippodrome, Birmingham
 1997 – Jack and the Beanstalk – Fairy – Churchill Theatre, Bromley
 1999 – Aladdin – Genie – The Grand Theatre, Swansea
 2000 – Snow White – Wicked Queen – Alban Arena, St. Albans
 2001 – Snow White – Wicked Queen – Broadway Theatre, Lewisham
 2002 – Aladdin – Aladdin – Civic Hall, Bedworth
 2003 – Peter Pan – Herrietta & Mrs Darling – New Theatre, Hull
 2004 – Cinderella – Lady Cruella – New Theatre, North Wales Theatre, Llandudno
 2005 – Sleeping Beauty – Fairy Moan – Broadway Theatre, Peterborough
 2006 – Sleeping Beauty – Lilac Fairy – Plaza Theatre, Stockport
 2007 – Robin Hood – The Enchantress – Connaught Theatre, Worthing
 2008 – Snow White – Wicked Queen – New Theatre Hull
 2009 – Snow White – Wicked Queen – Playhouse, Weston-Super-Mare
 2010 – Sleeping Beauty – Carabosse – Palace Theatre, Newark
 2011 – Sleeping Beauty – Carabosse – Harlequin Theatre, Redhill
 2012 – Beauty and the Beast – Silver Enchantress – Hexagon Theatre, Reading
 2013 – Sleeping Beauty – Lilac Fairy – Middlesbrough Theatre
 2015 – Sleeping Beauty – Malicious (the evil fairy) – Lincoln Theatre Royal
 2016 – Jack and the Beanstalk – Fairy Pea Pod – King's Theatre, Portsmouth
 2017 – Aladdin – Slave of the Ring – Northwich Memorial Court, Cheshire
 2018 - Sleeping Beauty - Carabosse - Castleford Civic Centre
 2019 - Snow White - Wicked Queen - Grand Opera House, York
 2021 – Cinderella - Fairy Fabulous - Grimsby Auditorium
 2022 - Sleeping Beauty - Carabosse - Playhouse, Weston-Super-Mare

References

External links

Official site
I'm A Celebrity Get Me Out of Here 2014 Interview with Vicki Michelle (Contestant)

1950 births
Living people
English television actresses
Members of the Order of the British Empire
People from Chigwell
Actresses from Essex
English soap opera actresses
English television personalities
Alumni of the Aida Foster Theatre School
20th-century English actresses
21st-century English actresses
British comedy actresses
I'm a Celebrity...Get Me Out of Here! (British TV series) participants